Luri  is a Southwestern Iranian language continuum spoken by the Lur people, an Iranian people native to Western Asia. The Luri dialects are descended from Middle Persian and are Central Luri, Bakhtiari, and Southern Luri. This language is spoken mainly by the Bakhtiari and Southern Lurs (Kohgiluyeh and Boyer-Ahmad, Mamasani, Sepidan, Bandar Ganaveh, Bandar Deylam) in Iran.

History
Luri is the closest living language to Archaic and Middle Persian. The language descends from Middle Persian (Parsig). It belongs to the Persid or Southern Zagros group, and is lexically similar to modern Persian, differing mainly in phonology.

According to the Encyclopædia Iranica, "All Lori dialects closely resemble standard Persian and probably developed from a stage of Persian similar to that represented in Early New Persian texts written in Perso-Arabic script. The sole typical Lori feature not known in early New Persian or derivable from it is the inchoative marker (see below), though even this is found in Judeo-Persian texts". The Bakhtiāri dialect  may be closer to Persian. There are two distinct languages, Greater Luri (Lor-e bozorg),  Southern Luri (including Bakhtiari dialect), and Lesser Luri (Lor-e kuček),  Northern Luri.

Geography

Northern Luri 
Around  of Hamadan province speak Northern Luri.

Bakhtiari 
The Bakhtiari dialect is the main first language in the province of Chaharmahal and Bakhtiari (around ), except around Sharekord, Borujen, Ben and Saman counties, where Persian, Turkic and Chaharmahali dialect predominate. Around  of Isfahan province speak Bakhtiari.

Statistics

Internal classification
The language consists of Central Luri, Bakhtiari, and Southern Luri. Central Luri is spoken in northern parts of Luri communities including eastern, central and northern parts of Luristan province, southern parts of Hamadan province mainly in Malayer, Nahavand and Tuyserkan counties, southern regions of Ilam province and southeastern parts of Markazi province. Bakhtiari is used by Bakhtiari people in South Luristan, Chaharmahal and Bakhtiari province, significant regions in north and east of Khouzestan and western regions of Isfahan province. Finally, Southern Luri is spoken throughout Kohgiluyeh and Boyer-Ahmad province, and in western and central regions in Fars province, northern and western parts of Bushehr province and southeastern regions of Khouzestan. Several Luri communities are spread sporadically across the Iranian Plateau e.g. Khorasan (Beyranvand and Bakhtiari Luri descendants), Kerman, Guilan and Tehran provinces.

Phonology

Vowels 

 // may also range to a higher // in the Northern dialect.

 Vowels /, / may also be realized as more close [, ] within diphthongs or before glide sounds.
 /, / can also be heard as higher [] in Southern Luri.
 // can also be raised as [] or [] before semivowels.

Consonants 

 // occurs in Northern Luri.
 Velar fricatives /, / as equivalent to uvular fricatives /, /, occur in Northern Luri.
 // occurs in Southern Luri.
 // occurs in Northern Luri, as well as in words borrowed from Persian.
 // can also be heard as a trill [] in Southern Luri.

 // also occurs as a glide to elongate short vowels (eg. /oh/). 
 [, ] occur as allophones of a labiodental approximant //.

Vocabulary
In comparison with other Iranian languages, Luri has been less affected by foreign languages such as Arabic and Turkic. Nowadays, many ancient Iranian language characteristics are preserved and can be observed in Luri grammar and vocabulary. According to diverse regional and socio-ecological conditions and due to longtime social interrelations with adjacent ethnic groups especially Kurds and Persian people, different dialects of Luri, despite mainly common characteristics, have significant differences. The northern dialect tends to have more Kurdish loanwords inside and southern dialects (Bakhtiari and Southern Luri) have been more exposed to Persian loanwords.

See also 

 Bakhtiari dialect
 Borujerdi dialect
 Dialects of Fars

References

Further reading
Freidl, Erika. 2015. Warm Hearts and Sharp Tongues: Life in 555 Proverbs from the Zagros Mountains of Iran. Vienna: New Academic Press. 
 F. Vahman and G. Asatrian, Poetry of the Baxtiārīs: Love Poems, Wedding Songs, Lullabies, Laments, Copenhagen, 1995.

External links 

 
 
 Bakhtiari tribe Lori dialect, Encyclopædia Iranica
 Luri language: How many languages? - By Erik John Anonby - The Royal Asiatic Society, 2003 - Printed in the UK

Languages of Iran
Southwestern Iranian languages